Umar Zahir (22 November 1963) is a Maldivian singer.

Early life and career
Zahir began his career as a musician by joining several music bands in performing at resorts and events. It was then his talent was identified by music composers and producers, where he was offered to lend his voice for several of their compositions. His album series Hanhaara became a record-breaking album and its songs including "Erey Haadha Rueemey" and "Mooney Thee Hiyy Edhey" became chartbusters upon release. In an article published by Mihaaru, Ahmed Adhushan wrote: "Apart from his soulful rendition of the songs, his performance becomes an instant attachment to the music lovers, for its emotional and meaningful lyrics".

With the fading demand for studio albums, Zahir slowly become detached from the music releases.   In 2014, he served on the National Honours Committee. However, in 2018, he formed a music band titled "Uzy" and made a comeback into the musical scene where he announced that he will frequently collaborate with other singers and more casually perform in resorts and events, similar to his career peak days. This was followed by the television song program, Mooney Thee Hiyy Edhey where several singers including, Fazeela Amir, Rafiyath Rameeza, Shifa Thaufeeq and Sama Moosa. In 2020, Zahir was ranked at the fifth position in the list of "Most Listened Vocalist of 2020" compiled by the music streaming platform, Lavafoshi, marking him as the second playback singer to be featured in the list after Ali Rameez. In February 2021, Zahir announces his retirement and mentioned that he inclines to expand his own business.

Discography

Feature film

Television

Non-film songs

Accolades

References 

Living people
People from Malé
1963 births
Maldivian playback singers